Xishan Township is a township in Mangshi, Yunnan, China. It is surrounded by Wuchalu Township on the north, Mengyue Township and Wangzishu Township on the west, and Zhefang Town on the east and south. Ninety percent of the local population is Jingpo people.

Administrative division
As of December 2015, the township is divided into 6 villages: 
 Nongbing 
 Bangjiao 
 Mangdong 
 Maojiang 
 Benqiang 
 Yingpan

History
In 1958, Xishan Commune was set up. 

It was renamed "Xiangyang Commune" in 1969 and two years later it reverted to its former name of "Xishan Commune".

In 1984 its name was changed to "Xishan District".

It was upgraded to a township in 1988.

Geography
The highest elevation is 1750 meters and the lowest is 780 meters.

The Longchuan River flows through the township.

Education
 Xishan Middle School

Economy
The local economy is primarily based upon agriculture. Cash crops are mainly rice, wheat, sugarcane and tea.

Transport
The National Highway G56 passes across the township.

The Provincial Highway S320 runs north to south through the township.

References

Divisions of Mangshi